Miroslav Janů (8 November 1959 – 24 January 2013) was a Czech football defender and later manager. As a player, he played a total of 240 matches in the Czechoslovak First League, scoring five times.

Playing career
Janů started his football career as a youth player at TJ Dynamo České Budějovice, before moving to Slavia Prague at the age of 17. He played 201 matches for Slavia in an 11-year spell. He went on to play for Bohemians Prague for two years before heading to Malaysia. In the 1992–93 season he returned to Czechoslovakia, playing four more games for Bohemians. He finished his career with a total of 240 games in the Czechoslovak First League, having scored five goals.

He played for the Czechoslovakia Olympic football team in some qualification matches for the 1988 Summer Olympics but the team didn't qualify for the tournament.

Management career
In May 2002, Janů was appointed as manager of Czech 2. Liga side Most, replacing Luboš Urban. He was given the position until the end of the season, with five games remaining.

Janů was appointed as assistant manager to Karel Jarolím at Slavia Prague in April 2005. He left Slavia and moved to Indonesia in October 2006 to become the manager of Arema FC.

His coaching adventure in Indonesia started in Persigo and then PSM. He led PSM to second place in the 2004 Liga Indonesia Premier Division.
He joined Arema for a second time in the 2010–11 season, replacing Dutchman Robert Alberts. Arema finished the season in second place.

Death 

He died in Surabaya, Indonesia on 24 January 2013 from a suspected heart attack.

References 

1959 births
2013 deaths
Footballers from Prague
Czech footballers
Czechoslovak footballers
SK Slavia Prague players
Czech football managers
FK Baník Most managers
PSM Makassar managers
Expatriate footballers in Indonesia
Expatriate footballers in Malaysia
Czech expatriate sportspeople in Indonesia
Association football defenders
SK Slavia Prague non-playing staff
Association football coaches